Private Lessons may refer to:

 Private Lessons (1975 film), a 1975 Italian film starring Carroll Baker
 Private Lessons (1981 film), an American comedy film starring Sylvia Kristel
 Private Lessons (2008 film), a Belgian drama film directed by Joachim Lafosse